The 2016–17 Mississippi State Bulldogs basketball team represented Mississippi State University in the 2016–17 NCAA Division I men's basketball season. The Bulldogs, led by second year head coach Ben Howland, played their home games at the Humphrey Coliseum in Starkville, Mississippi as a member of the Southeastern Conference. They finished the season 16–16, 6–12 in SEC play to finish in 12th place. They defeated LSU in the SEC tournament before losing in the second round to Alabama.

Previous season
The Bulldogs finished the season 14–17, 7–11 in SEC play to finish in 11th place. They lost to Georgia in the second round of the SEC tournament.

Departures

Recruits

Roster

Schedule and results

|-
!colspan=9 style="background:#660000; color:white;"| Exhibition

|-
!colspan=9 style="background:#660000; color:white;"| Non-conference regular season

|-
!colspan=9 style="background:#660000; color:white;"| SEC regular season

|-
!colspan=9 style="background:#660000; color:white;"| SEC tournament

See also
2016–17 Mississippi State Bulldogs women's basketball team

References

Mississippi State Bulldogs men's basketball seasons
Mississippi State
Mississippi State Bulldogs basketball
Mississippi State Bulldogs basketball